Jessica Jolliffe (née Hull born 22 October 1996) is an Australian middle- and long-distance runner. She is the Oceanian record holder for the 1500 metres (out and indoor), mile (out and indoor) and 3000 metres, and the Australian record holder for the 5000 metres and indoor 3000 m.

Hull graduated from the University of Oregon, where she earned seven All-American honours and was a four-time NCAA Champion. She is a two-time Australian national champion.

Early years
Jessica Hull started running cross country at school. She then joined Albion Park Little Athletics Centre where she was guided by her father, Simon, who had been a national level middle-distance runner. After school she went to the United States where she studied at University of Oregon completing a degree in Human Physiology.

Career

Prep
Hull won the under-17 1500 metres at the 2012 Australian Athletics Championships with a time of 4:28.11.

She finished seventh in the 3000 metres at the 2014 World Junior Championships in Athletics in a personal best time of 9:08.85.

Hull won the 1500 m at the 2015 Australian Junior Championships. She placed 69th in the women's junior race at the IAAF World Cross Country Championships that year with a time of 23:11.

NCAA
Hull was the NCAA (US college) 1500m champion in 2018 and over the next year added podium finishes indoors, in relays and cross country. She was a student-athlete and graduated from University of Oregon in 2019, where she earned 7 All-American honors and was a 4 time NCAA Division 1 Champion.

Professional
In July 2019, Hull signed with Nike, Inc and joined the (now defunct) Nike Oregon Project.

On 25 January 2020, she set an Oceanian 1500 metres records at the New Balance Indoor Grand Prix, a World Athletics Indoor Tour meet in Boston, winning the event with a time of 4:04.14. On 14 August that year, she set an Australian national 5000 metres record at Monaco Diamond League, finishing fourth in 14:43.80.

On 4 August 2021, Hull reached the final of the 1500 m event at the postponed 2020 Tokyo Olympics, which she achieved by running an Oceanian record time of 3:58.81 to come in fourth place in the semi-final. Two days later, she placed 11th in the final in a time of 4:02.63.

Personal life
In December 2022, Jessica and Daniel Jolliffe married.

Statistics

International competitions

NCAA

Source:

National titles
 Australian Athletics Championships
 5000 metres: 2020, 2022

References

External links

 
 Jessica Hull Milesplit profile

Living people
1996 births
Australian female middle-distance runners
Track and field athletes from Portland, Oregon
Oregon Ducks women's track and field athletes
University of Oregon alumni
Athletes (track and field) at the 2020 Summer Olympics
Olympic athletes of Australia